Hiltonius hebes is a species of millipede in the family Spirobolidae.

References

Further reading

 

Spirobolida
Articles created by Qbugbot
Animals described in 1887